The Nicholas–Lang House is a house located in southwest Portland, Oregon listed on the National Register of Historic Places.

See also
 National Register of Historic Places listings in Southwest Portland, Oregon

References

Houses on the National Register of Historic Places in Portland, Oregon
Queen Anne architecture in Oregon
Houses completed in 1884
1884 establishments in Oregon
Southwest Hills, Portland, Oregon
Portland Historic Landmarks